Euthria cumulata is a species of sea snail, a marine gastropod mollusk in the family Buccinidae, the true whelks.

Description
The length of the shell attains 36.5 mm.

Distribution
This marine species occurs off New Caledonia

References

 Fraussen, K.; Hadorn, R. (2003). Six new Buccinidae (Mollusca: Gastropoda) from New Caledonia. Novapex. 4(2-3): 33-50
 Bouchet, P.; Héros, V.; Lozouet, P.; Maestrati, P. (2008). A quarter-century of deep-sea malacological exploration in the South and West Pacific: Where do we stand? How far to go?. in: Héros, V. et al. (Ed.) Tropical Deep-Sea Benthos 25. Mémoires du Muséum national d'Histoire naturelle (1993). 196: 9-40.

External links

Buccinidae
Gastropods described in 2003